This is a list of Tasmanian Football League leading goalkickers''' under all names of the competition.

TFA leading goalkicker: 1879–1886

(Tasmanian Football Association (TFA) – formed 12 June 1879) 
1879 – W. Cundy (Railway) – 7
1880 – W. Cundy (Railway) – 7
1881 – P. Butler (City) – 7
1882 – A. Stuart (Holebrook) – 6
1883 – E. Burgess (Cricketers) – 13
1884 – E. Burgess (Cricketers) – 10
1885 – Kenny Burn (Railway) – 14
1886 – J. Dunlop (City) – 7

STFA leading goalkicker: 1887–1996

(Southern Tasmanian Football Association (STFA) – formed 2 April 1887) 
1887 – Kenny Burn (Railway) – 11
1888 – T. Barlow (Holebrook) – 6
1889 – C. Richards (Railway) – 9
1890 – T. Addison (Railway) – 9
1891 – S. Howe (Holebrook) – 9
1892 – S. Howe (Holebrook) – 9
1893 – J. Vimpany (Railway) – 12
1894 – G. Wright (Railway) – 12
1895 – C. Guest (City) – 21
1896 – G. Somers (North Hobart) – 13

STFL leading goalkicker: 1897

(Southern Tasmanian Football League (STFL) – formed 8 May 1897) 
1897 – No records available

STFA leading goalkicker: 1898–1905

(Southern Tasmanian Football Association (STFA) – reformed 5 May 1898)  
1898 – W. Abel (Lefroy) – 11
1899 – W. Facy (Lefroy) – 16
1900 – J. Ayres (Wellington) – 10
1901 – R. Hawson (Lefroy) – 18
1902 – W. Lee (Wellington) – 8
1903 – A. Walton (North Hobart) – 18
1904 – G. Somers (Wellington) – 11
1905 – T. Mills (North Hobart) – 15

TFL leading goalkicker: 1906–1927

(Tasmanian Football League (TFL) – formed 28 May 1906) 
1906 – T. Mills (North Hobart) – 13
1907 – W. Lee (North Hobart) – 14
1908 – FiG. Cook (North Hobart) – 24
1909 – F. Burton (Cananore) – 11
1910 – C. Ward (Cananore) – 16
1911 – C. Ward (Cananore) – 24
1912 – A. Jones (Lefroy) – 17
1913 – G. Badernach (Cananore) – 13
1914 – S. Russell (North Hobart) – 26
1915 – A. Ringrose (Lefroy) – 18
1916 – TFL suspended due to World War I
1917 – TFL suspended due to World War I
1918 – TFL suspended due to World War I
1919 – TFL suspended due to influenza epidemic
1920 – [W. Jack (North Hobart) – 25
1921 – R. Manson (Lefroy) – 42
1922 – R. Manson (Lefroy) – 41
1923 – L. Stevens (North Hobart) – 26
1924 – J. Brain (Cananore) – 47
1925 – F. Ahearne (Cananore) – 50
1926 – J. Brain (Cananore) – 64
1927 – F. Ahearne (Cananore) – 45

TANFL leading goalkicker: 1928–1985

(Tasmanian Australian National Football League (TANFL) – formed 29 August 1927) 
1928 – H. Smith (New Town) – 46
1929 – Alan Rait (North Hobart) – 92
1930 – Alan Rait (North Hobart) – 112
1931 – Alan Rait (North Hobart) – 85
1932 – Alan Rait (North Hobart) – 102
1933 – D. Kenna (New Town) – 55
1934 – Tom Heathorn (Lefroy) – 101
1935 – Alan Rait (North Hobart) – 84
1936 – Alan Rait (North Hobart) – 98
1937 – Alan Rait (North Hobart) – 62
1938 –  T. Richardson (North Hobart) – 75
1939 – Jack Metherell (North Hobart) – 61
1940 – Jack Metherell (North Hobart) – 69
1941 – Jack Metherell (North Hobart) – 64
1942 – TANFL suspended due to World War II
1943 – TANFL suspended due to World War II
1944 – TANFL suspended due to World War II
1945 – E. Collis (North Hobart) – 54
1946 – Alf Cook (New Town) – 58
1947 – Lance Collins (Sandy Bay) – 50
1948 – Ian Westell (Sandy Bay) – 57
1949 – Albert Park (New Town) – 73
1950 – Ian Westell (Sandy Bay) – 83
1951 – J. Cooper (Clarence) – 42
1952 – Ian Westell (Sandy Bay) – 81
1953 – Bert Shaw (Sandy Bay) – 51
1954 – Ian Westell (Sandy Bay) – 68
1955 – Ian Westell (Sandy Bay) – 88
1956 – Noel Clarke (North Hobart) – 80
1957 – Ian Westell (Sandy Bay) – 67
1958 – Paddy Cooper (North Hobart) – 45
1959 – Mal Pascoe (Hobart) – 75
1960 – Mal Pascoe (Hobart) – 57
1961 – Noel Clarke (North Hobart) – 74
1962 – David Collins (North Hobart) – 77
1963 – Peter Hudson (New Norfolk) – 79
1964 – Peter Hudson (New Norfolk) – 86
1965 – Peter Hudson (New Norfolk) – 110
1966 – Peter Hudson (New Norfolk) – 103
1967 – David Collins (North Hobart) – 58
1968 – John Mills (Clarence) – 49
1969 – Brent Palfreyman (Sandy Bay) – 51
1970 – Brent Palfreyman (Sandy Bay) – 67
1971 – Terry Mayne (Clarence) – 74
1972 – Darryl Sutton (Glenorchy) – 73
1973 – Rod Adams (Sandy Bay) – 96
1974 – Frank Ogle (Glenorchy) – 55
1975 – Peter Hudson (Glenorchy) – 76
1976 – Peter Hudson (Glenorchy) – 133
1977 – Col Smith (Hobart) – 49
1978 – Peter Hudson (Glenorchy) – 153
1979 – Peter Hudson (Glenorchy) – 179
1980 – Paul Courto (Hobart) – 86
1981 – Andrew Vanderfeen (Clarence) – 66
1982 – Brett Stephens (North Hobart) – 92
1983 – Wayne Fox (New Norfolk) – 135
1984 – Wayne Fox (New Norfolk) – 93
1985 – Wayne Fox (New Norfolk) – 130

TFL Statewide League leading goalkicker: 1986–2000

(Tasmanian Football League Statewide League (TFL Statewide League) – formed January 1986)  
1986 – Wayne Fox (Hobart) – 105
1987 – Paul Dac (New Norfolk) – 80, Wayne Fox (Hobart) – 80 and Steve McQueen (North Hobart) – 80
1988 – Chris Reynolds (Devonport) – 111
1989 – Shane Fell (Glenorchy) – 114
1990 – Paul Dac (New Norfolk) – 103
1991 – Paul Dac (New Norfolk) – 133
1992 – Byron Howard (North Hobart) – 92
1993 – Keith Robinson (Hobart) – 76
1994 – Paul Dac (Clarence) – 94
1995 – Byron Howard (North Hobart) – 104
1996 – Justin Plapp (Burnie Dockers) – 98
1997 – Byron Howard (North Hobart) – 70
1998 – Ken Rainsford (Devonport) – 94

TSFL leading goalkicker: 1999

(Tasmanian State Football League (TSFL) – formed February 1999) 
1999 – Adam Aherne (Northern Bombers) – 68

SWL leading goalkicker: 2000

(State Wide League (SWL) – formed January 2000) 
2000 – Scott Allen (Clarence) – 80

TSL leading goalkicker: 2009–present

(Tasmanian State League (TSL) – formed 8 December 2008) 
2009 – Brad Dutton (Clarence) – 75
2010 – Brian Finch (Launceston) – 94
2011 – Brian Finch (Launceston) – 105
2012 – Mitchell Williamson (Clarence) – 83
2013 – Sonny Whiting (Launceston) – 76
2014 – Aaron Cornelius (Glenorchy) – 67
2015 – Jaye Bowden (Glenorchy) – 57
2016 – Jaye Bowden (Glenorchy) – 75
2017 – Jaye Bowden (Glenorchy) – 52
2018 – Mitch Thorp (Launceston) - 62
2019 – Aiden Grace (Glenorchy) - 50

Australian rules football-related lists
Australian rules football records and statistics
Goalkickers